3 is a number, numeral, and glyph.

3, three, or III may also refer to:

 AD 3, the third year of the AD era
 3 BC, the third year before the AD era
 March, the third month

Books
 Three of Them (Russian: , literally, "three"), a 1901 novel by Maksim Gorky
 Three, a 1946 novel by William Sansom
 Three, a 1970 novel by Sylvia Ashton-Warner 
 Three (novel), a 2003 suspense novel by Ted Dekker
 Three (comics), a  graphic novel by Kieron Gillen.
 3, a 2004 novel by Julie Hilden 
 Three, a collection of three plays by Lillian Hellman
 Three By Flannery O'Connor, collection Flannery O'Connor bibliography

Brands
 3 (telecommunications), a global telecommunications brand
 3Arena, indoor amphitheatre in Ireland operating with the "3" brand
 3 Hong Kong, telecommunications company operating in Hong Kong
 Three Australia, Australian telecommunications company
 Three Ireland, Irish telecommunications company
 Three UK, British telecommunications and internet service provider
 Wind Tre, Italian telecommunications company

Film
 Three (1965 film), a Yugoslavian film by Aleksandar Petrović
 Three (1969 film), starring Charlotte Rampling and Sam Waterston
 Three (2002 film), an Asian horror movie collaboration
 3: The Dale Earnhardt Story, a 2004 television movie
 Survival Island or Three, a 2005 film starring Billy Zane and Kelly Brook
 Three (2006 film), based on the novel with the same name
 Three (2008 film), a Telugu film
 Three – Love, Lies and Betrayal, a 2009 film starring Aashish Chaudhary, Nausheen Ali Sardar & Akshay Kapoor
 Three (2010 film), a German film also known as 3
 3 (1996 film), an Italian film also known as Tre
 3 (2012 Tamil film), a Tamil film starring Dhanush and Shruti Haasan
 3 (2012 Uruguayan film), a Uruguayan drama film directed by Pablo Stoll
 Three (2016 film), a Hong Kong-Chinese film by Johnnie To
 3 (2018 film), a Kannada film starring Pooja Gandhi
 Three (2020 film), a 2020 film Kazakh-South Korean film

 The Three, a 2020 Russian film

Television
 Three (TV series), a 1998 American series
 3 (TV series), a 2012 CBS reality television series
 "3" (The X-Files), a 1994 episode
 3%, a 2016 Brazilian dystopian thriller series
 3: The Dale Earnhardt Story, a 2004 television movie
 Three's Company, 1970's TV series
 BBC Three, a British television channel.
 Channel 3, television channel traditionally associated with ITV (TV network) in the UK
Three (TV channel), a New Zealand television channel

Music

Music theory and notation
 The mediant, the third note in a major or minor scale, often called a third and notated III or iii
 A triad (music), a chord with three notes, usually spaced in thirds
 A triplet, a type of tuplet, where a beat is split into three spaces

Artists
 3 (1980s band), a rock band of Keith Emerson, Robert Berry and Carl Palmer
 3 (American band), an experimental progressive band based in Woodstock, New York
 III, the Inti Creates sound team
 Three (band), a post hardcore band signed to Dischord Records
 Three, a 1960s avant-garde jazz group fronted by Don Francks
 Thriii, an American girl group composed of China Anne McClain, Sierra McClain, and Lauryn McClain
 BK3, Three or 3, a band with Bill Kreutzmann, Scott Murawski and Oteil Burbridge
 #3, the pseudonym of American musician Chris Fehn when performing with Slipknot

Albums
 Acid King III, by Acid King, 2005
 AB III, by Alter Bridge, 2010
 Three, by APB (band), 2007
 Three, by Armageddon (Swedish band), 2002
 3 (The Atomic Bitchwax album), 2005
 III (Bad Books album), 2019
 III (BadBadNotGood album), 2014
 III (Banks album), 2019
 III, by Dany Bédar, 2008
 3 (Bo Bice album), 2010
 Billy Talent III, by Billy Talent, 2009
 Three (The Black Heart Procession album), 2000
 Black Widow III, an album by Black Widow (band), 1972
 Three (Blue Man Group album), 2016
 III (Gui Boratto album), 2011
 III (Bosse-de-Nage album), 2012
 III (Chad Brock album), 2001
 3 (Buffalo Killers album), 2011
 3 (The Butchies album), 2001
 Three (The John Butler Trio album), 2001
 3 (Calogero album), 2004
 Chicago III, by Chicago, 1971
 Three (Charlotte Church EP), 2013
 III (Crystal Castles album), 2012
 Cypress Hill III: Temples of Boom, by Cypress Hill, 1995
 Danzig III: How the Gods Kill, by Danzig, 1992
 III, by Demons & Wizards, 2020
 III (Download album), 1997
 Three (End of Everything album), 2006
 III (Espers album), 2009
 III (Eths album), 2012
 III (Family Force 5 album), 2011
 3, by Final, 2006
 3 (FireHouse album), 1995
 Focus 3, by Focus, 1972
 III (Foster the People EP), 2017
 III (Fuzz album), 2020
 Three (Gloriana album), 2015
 III (Haloo Helsinki! album), 2011
  III (Hillsong Young & Free album), 2018
 Three, by Honey, 2001
 3 (honeyhoney album), 2015
 3 (Ich Troje album), 1999
 3 (Indochine album), 1985
 Three (Bob James album), 1976
 III (JoJo EP), 2015
 BK3 (album) by Bruce Kulick, 2010
 Led Zeppelin III, by Led Zeppelin, 1970
 III (The Lumineers album), 2019
 III (Makthaverskan album), 2017
 III, by Masked Intruder, 2019
 3 (Mastedon album), 2009
 III (Maylene and the Sons of Disaster album), 2009
 iii, by Milosh, 2008
 III (Moderat album), 2016
 III (Moistboyz album), 2002
 III (Stanton Moore album), 2006
 III, by Mt. Egypt, 2009
 III (Joe Nichols album), 2005
 3 (Netsky album), 2009 (also stylised III)
 3 (Ngaiire album), 2021
 Three (Nine Days album), 1998
 3 (Nouvelle Vague album), 2009
 III (Orbital EP), 1991
 3, by Peace Love & Pitbulls, 1997
 Three (Ph.D. album), 2009
 Three (Phantogram album), 2016
 Three (Joel Plaskett album), 2009
 3 (Pole album), 2000
 3rd (The Rasmus EP), 1996
 3 (soundtrack), by Anirudh Ravichander, from the 2012 Tamil film
 Phase Three (album), by Riverdales, 2003
 III (Sahg album), 2010
 Santana (1971 album), Santana, 1971 (often referred to as III)
 3 (Alejandro Sanz album), 1995
 #3 (The Script album), 2012
 Sebadoh III, by Sebadoh, 1991
 #3 (Shakespears Sister album), 2004
 III (Shiny Toy Guns album), 2012
 III (Bob Sinclar album), 2003
 3's, by Smile Empty Soul, 2012
 iii (Miike Snow album), 2016
 3 (Soulfly album), 2002
 III (S.O.S. Band album), 1982
 Threes (album), by Sparta, 2006
 #3 (Suburban Kids with Biblical Names album), 2005
 Three (Sugababes album), 2003
 III (Take That album), 2014
 3 (Tricot album), 2017
 Three (Tubeless Hearts album), 1994
 3 (Typical Cats album), 2012
 Three (U2 EP), 1979
 Van Halen III, by Van Halen, 1998
 3 (Violent Femmes album), 1989
 III, by Xerath, 2014

Songs
 "3" (Britney Spears song), 2009
 "3" (Disturbed song), 2011
 "3", a song by Flume from the album Skin, 2016
 "3", a song by Scott Storch, 2021
 "3", a song by Ultravox from the B-side of "Same Old Story", 1986
 ".3", a song by Porcupine Tree from the album In Absentia, 2002
 "III", by Foster the People from Sacred Hearts Club, 2017
 "Tres" (song) (English: 'Three'), a 2008 song by Juanes
 "Three", a song by Massive Attack from the album Protection, 1994
 "Three", a song by Future and Young Thug from the mixtape Super Slimey, 2017
 "Three", a song by Lily Allen from the album No Shame, 2018
 "Three", a 1969 song by Jimmy Newman
 "Three", a 1969 song by Strawberry Alarm Clock
 "Song 3", a song by Robbie Williams from the album Escapology, 2002
 "Song Three", a song from the Mahagonny-Songspiel
 "Three", a song by Karma to Burn from the album Wild, Wonderful Purgatory, 1999

Other music
 3 Songs (disambiguation)
 3 EPs, a 1994 Tall Dwarfs EP
 III Records, a Japanese record label
 The Three E.P.'s, a 1998 The Beta Band album

Science and technology 
 3, the resin identification code for polyvinyw3wl chloride
 3, the DVD region code for many East Asian countries (except for Japan and Ch2ina)
 Group 3 element, often written as IIIw
 A superscript 3 (³) is used to represent the cubing of a number
 Schläfli symbol for an equilateral triangle
 Giant star (III), in the Yerkes spectral classification

Transportation

Automobiles
 BMW 3 Series, a German compact luxury car
 Chery Arrizo 3, a Chinese subcompact sedan
 Chery Tiggo 3, a Chinese compact SUV
 Lynk & Co 03, a Chinese subcompact crossover
 Mazda3, a Japanese compact sedan
 MG 3, a British-Chinese subcompact hatchback
 Peugeot Type 3, a French steam-powered car
 Qoros 3, a Chinese compact car
 Tesla Model 3, an American compact electric sedan
 Volkswagen Type 3, a German compact car

Roads and routes
 3 (New York City Subway service), a service of the New York City Subway
 List of highways numbered 3

Other uses
 Samsung Galaxy 3, a smartphone
 Three-point field goal, a long shot in basketball
 Threes, a game on the iPhone
 Company (musical),  a musical originally titled Threes
 Three, a personality type of the Enneagram of Personality typology
 3, Triq ix-Xatt, a nineteenth-century building in Marsaskala, Malta
 Three Percenters, a far-right American paramilitary group advocating gun rights and resisting government

Similar glyphs
 Open-mid central unrounded vowel, ɜ, of the International Phonetic Alphabet (IPA), used in Cherokee and some English pronunciation
 Ezh (letter), Ʒ, a symbol for dram
 Lowercase ezh, ʒ, representing the Voiced palato-alveolar sibilant of the IPA, used in several African languages
 Dram (unit) (ℨ) and Gothic font letter Z
 Yogh or Ȝ, letter used in Middle English and Middle Scots
 Gyfu or Gar (rune) Anglo Saxon runes transliterated as ȝ
 Ze (Cyrillic) or З, eleventh letter of Kazakh, tenth letter of Ukrainian, Dungan, ninth letter of Russian, Belarusian, Uzbek, Serbo-Croatian, Mongolian, eighth letter of Bulgarian and Kyrgyz alphabets; and Cyrillic numeral 7
 E (Cyrillic) or Э, fortieth letter of Kazakh, thirty-fifth letter of Dungan, thirty-third letter of Mongolian, thirty-first letter of Russian, thirtieth letter of Belarusian, twenty-eighth letter of Kyrgyz, and twenty-seventh letter of Uzbek alphabets
 Abkhazian Dze or Ӡ, nineteenth letter of Abkhazian Cyrillic script alphabet
 Ro (kana) or ろ, in hiragana Japanese script
 ③, one of the Enclosed Alphanumerics
 Da̰ dwé or ဒ, nineteenth letter of Burmese alphabet
 Vin or ვ, sixth letter of Georgian alphabet and Georgian numeral 6
 Kan or კ, eleventh letter of Georgian alphabet and Georgian numeral 20
 Par or პ, seventeenth letter of Georgian alphabet and Georgian numeral 80
 Vie or ჳ, obsolete twenty-second letter of Georgian alphabet
 Hi or Յ, twenty-first letter of Armenian alphabet and Armenian numeral 300
 ౩, Telugu alphabet numeral 3
 ૩, Gujarati alphabet numeral 3
 ३, Devanagari numeral 3
 ੩, Gurmukhī alphabet numeral 3
 ༣, Tibetan alphabet numeral 3
 Ꜣ, used to transcribe the Ancient Egyptian 'aleph' phoneme; see Transliteration of Ancient Egyptian

See also
 Lithium (atomic number), a chemical element
 03 (disambiguation)
 III (disambiguation)
 Number Three (disambiguation)
 Third (disambiguation)
 Model 3 (disambiguation)
 Type III (disambiguation)
 Class 3 (disambiguation)